Alain Finkielkraut (born 30 June 1949) is a French philosopher and public intellectual. He has written books and essays on a wide range of topics, many on the ideas of tradition and identitary nonviolence, including Jewish identity and antisemitism, French colonialism, the mission of the French education system in immigrant assimilation, and the Yugoslav Wars. He often appears on French television.

He joined the Department of French Literature in the University of California, Berkeley as an assistant professor in 1976, and from 1989 to 2014 he was professor of History of Ideas in the École Polytechnique department of humanities and social sciences. He was elected member of the Académie française (Seat 21) on 10 April 2014.

As a thinker, Finkielkraut defines himself as being "at the same time classical and romantic". Finkielkraut deplores what he sees as the deterioration of Western tradition through multiculturalism and relativism. 

In 2010, he was involved in founding JCall, a left-wing advocacy group based in Europe to lobby the European Parliament on foreign policy issues concerning the Middle East and Israel in particular.

Life
Finkielkraut is the son of a Polish Jewish manufacturer of fine leather goods who survived the Auschwitz concentration camp.

Work
Finkielkraut studied modern literature at the École normale supérieure de Saint-Cloud. Broadly speaking, his ideas may be described as being in the same vein as those of Emmanuel Levinas and Hannah Arendt, a filiation he has repeatedly pointed out.

Finkielkraut first came to public attention when he and Pascal Bruckner co-authored a number of short but controversial essays intended to question the idea that a new emancipation was underway; these included The New Love Disorder (1977) (Le Nouveau Désordre amoureux) and At the Corner of the Street (1978) (Au Coin de la rue), as well as The Adventure (1979) (L'aventure). Finkielkraut then began publishing singly authored works on the public's betrayal of memory and our intransigence in the presence of events that, he argued, should move the public. This reflection led Finkielkraut to address post-Holocaust Jewish identity in Europe (The Imaginary Jew) (1983) (le Juif imaginaire). Seeking to promote what he calls a duty of memory, Finkielkraut also published The Future of a Negation: Reflexion on the Genocide Issue (1982) (Avenir d'une négation : réflexion sur la question du génocide) and later his comments on the Klaus Barbie trial, Remembering in Vain (La Mémoire vaine).

Finkielkraut feels particularly indebted to Emmanuel Levinas. In The Wisdom of Love (La Sagesse de l'amour), Finkielkraut discusses this debt in terms of modernity and its mirages. Finkielkraut continues his reflection on the matter in The Defeat of the Mind (1987) (La Défaite de la pensée) and The Ingratitude: Talks About Our Times (1999) (Ingratitude : conversation sur notre temps).

Essayist on society
In recent years, Alain Finkielkraut has given his opinion on a variety of topics in society, such as the Internet in The Internet, The Troubling Ecstasy (2001) (Internet, l'inquiétante extase). In the book Present Imperfect (2002) (L'Imparfait du présent), akin to a personal diary, he expresses his thoughts about various events in the world (especially the events of 11 September 2001).

Controversies
In 1995 Finkielkraut denounced the Cannes Film Festival's jury award, saying:
In recognizing "Underground", the Cannes jury thought it was honouring a creator with a thriving imagination. In fact, it has honoured a servile and flashy illustrator of criminal clichés. The Cannes jury ... praised a version of the most hackneyed and deceitful Serb propaganda. The devil himself could not have conceived so cruel an outrage against Bosnia, nor such a grotesque epilogue to Western incompetence and frivolity.
It was later revealed that Finkielkraut had not seen the film before writing his criticism. 

His interview published in the Haaretz magazine in November 2005 in which he gave his opinion about the 2005 French riots stirred up much controversy. Finkielkraut's remarked that the France national football team was "black, black, black, which causes sneers all over Europe" (as opposed to the expression "black-blanc-beur"—meaning "Black, White, Arab"—coined after the 1998 World Cup victory to honor the African and Afro Caribbean, European and North African origins of the players), adding that "if you point this out in France, you are thrown in jail." He also denounced African-American Muslims, claiming that there is an "Islamization of the blacks" happening in both America and France.

Anti-Zionist filmmaker Eyal Sivan took legal action against Finkielkraut after the Frenchman said Sivan "is, if you will, one of the actors in this particularly painful, particularly alarming reality, the Jewish anti-Semitism that rages today."

In 2009, he was criticized for his comment on Roman Polanski sexual offence in which a 13-year-old girl was involved. Finkielkraut claimed that she was a "teenager", "not a child".

He has been criticized for his close friendship with Croatian president Franjo Tuđman and was accused by David Bruce MacDonald of supporting "a nation whose leader was a Holocaust revisionist, at the helm of an authoritarian government."

In August 2018, Finkielkraut expressed in an interview with The Times of Israel his worries for French Jews and the future of France: "The anti-Semitism we're now experiencing in France is the worst I've ever seen in my lifetime, and I'm convinced it's going to get worse".

On 16 February 2019, Finkielkraut was accosted on the street by a group of yellow vest protesters in Paris when they chanced on him in Boulevard du Montparnasse. A 36-year-old French convert to Islam was indicted after saying that Finkelkraut was "going to die". Finkelkraut had previously expressed his sympathy for the yellow vest movement. In April, Finkelkraut stated that he had been repeatedly accosted by street protestors and told reporters, "I can no longer show my face on the street".

In April 2019, IEP (Sciences Po) announced the cancellation of a forum where Finkielkraut was to be a speaker, due to threats by "antifa" protestors.  Eugénie Bastié of Le Figaro denounced the cancellation as a "gangrenous" symptom of the Americanisation of French university life. The announcement was intended to mislead far-left protestors, and the lecture went  on in a different location.

While on the French TV channel LCI, he commented on the Duhamel scandal involving incest with a 13-14 boy and his father-in-law. Finkielkraut analyzed the affair from a post-68 perspective and described the victim as a "teenager", as a result of which he was summarily fired within days by the French TV news network he was working for as a commentator.

Bibliography
 The Religion of Humanity and the Sin of the Jews, essay in Azure magazine.
 Reflections on the Coming Anti-Semitism, essay in Azure magazine.
 Ralentir, mots-valises !, Seuil (1979)
 Le nouveau désordre amoureux, Seuil (1977)
 Au coin de la rue, l'aventure, Seuil (1979)
 Petit fictionnaire illustré : les mots qui manquent au dico, Seuil (1981)
 Le Juif imaginaire, Seuil (1981)
 L'avenir d'une négation, Seuil (1982)
 La sagesse de l'amour, Gallimard (1984)
 La défaite de la pensée, Gallimard (1987)
 La mémoire vaine, du Crime contre l'humanité, Gallimard (1989)
 Comment peut-on être Croate ?, Gallimard (1992)
 L'humanité perdue, Seuil (1996)
 Le mécontemporain. Charles Péguy, lecteur du monde moderne, Gallimard (1992)
 L'ingratitude. Conversation sur notre temps avec Antoine Robitaille, Gallimard (1999)
 Une voix vient de l'autre rive, Gallimard (2000)
 Internet, l'inquiétante extase, Mille et une nuits (2001)
 Penser le XXe siècle, École Polytechnique (2000)
 Des hommes et des bêtes, Tricorne (2000)
 L'imparfait du présent. Pièces brèves, Gallimard (2002)
 Enseigner les lettres aujourd'hui, Tricorne (2003)
 Les battements du monde, Pauvert (2003)
 Au nom de l'Autre. Réflexions sur l'antisémitisme qui vient, Gallimard (2003)
 Nous autres, modernes : quatre leçons, Ellipses (2005)
 Ce que peut la littérature, Stock (2006)
 Entretiens sur la laïcité, Verdier (2006)
 Qu'est-ce que la France, Stock (2007)
 La querelle de l'école, Stock (2007)
 Philosophie et modernité, École Polytechnique (2008)
 Un cœur intelligent, Stock/Flammarion (2009)
 « Pour une décence commune » in Regards sur la crise. Réflexions pour comprendre la crise… et en sortir, essay contributed to a collective work edited by Antoine Mercier, Paris, Éditions Hermann, 2010.
 L'explication, conversation avec Aude Lancelin, with Alain Badiou, Nouvelles Éditions Lignes, 2010.
 L'interminable écriture de l'Extermination, with Finkielkraut's direction, transcriptions of TV appearances on Répliques de France Culture, Stock, 2010.
 Et si l'amour durait, Stock, 2011
 L'identité malheureuse, Stock, 2013
 La Seule Exactitude, Stock, 2015
 En terrain miné, with Élisabeth de Fontenay, Stock, 2017
 À la première personne, Gallimard, 2019
 L'après littérature, Stock, 2021

References

External links

 Official website of the Institute for Levinassian Studies, co-founded by Alain Finkielkraut, Bernard-Henri Lévy and Benny Lévy
 “Voices on Antisemitism” Interview with Alain Finkielkraut from the United States Holocaust Memorial Museum

1949 births
Living people
20th-century French essayists
20th-century French male writers
20th-century French philosophers
21st-century French essayists
21st-century French male writers
21st-century French philosophers
ENS Fontenay-Saint-Cloud-Lyon alumni
French Ashkenazi Jews
French male essayists
French people of Polish-Jewish descent
French Zionists
Jewish philosophers
Members of the Académie Française
New Philosophers
Writers from Paris
Academic staff of École Polytechnique
University of California, Berkeley faculty